Ekmanochloa is a genus of plants in the grass family endemic to Cuba.

Description
Its habit is a perennial grass. Culms are erect; 38–63.25–100 cm long. Culm-nodes are constricted  or swollen. Leaves are differentiated into sheath and blade, or with blades commonly suppressed, transferring photosynthetic function to sheath and culm. Leaf-blades are linear or lanceolate.

Species 
Species include:

 Ekmanochloa aristata  Ekman  — Sierra de Moa.
 Ekmanochloa subaphylla  C.L.Hitchc. — Sierra de Nipe.

References

Bambusoideae genera
Endemic flora of Cuba
Grasses of North America
Taxa named by A. S. Hitchcock
Bambusoideae